George Dyson (born 26 March 1953) is an American non-fiction author and historian of technology whose publications broadly cover the evolution of technology in relation to the physical environment and the direction of society. He has written on a wide range of topics, including the history of computing, the development of algorithms and intelligence, communications systems, space exploration, and the design of watercraft.

Early life and education
Dyson's early life is described in Kenneth Brower's book The Starship and the Canoe. When he was sixteen he went to live in British Columbia to pursue his interest in kayaking.

From 1972 to 1975, he lived in a treehouse at a height of 30 metres that he built from salvaged materials on the shore of Burrard Inlet.  Dyson became a Canadian citizen and spent 20 years in British Columbia, designing kayaks, researching historic voyages and native peoples, and exploring the Inside Passage. He was, during this period, estranged from his father for some time.

Career
Dyson's first book, Baidarka, published in 1986, described his research on the history of the Aleutian kayak, its evolution in the hands of Russian fur traders, and his adaptation of its design to modern materials. He is the author of Project Orion: The Atomic Spaceship 1957–1965 and Darwin Among the Machines: The Evolution of Global Intelligence, in which he expands upon the premise of Samuel Butler's 1863 article of the same name and suggests that the Internet is a living, sentient being. His 2012 book Turing's Cathedral  has been described as "a creation myth of the digital universe." It was a finalist for the Los Angeles Times 2012 Book Prize in the science and technology category and was chosen by University of California Berkeley's annual "On the Same Page" program for the academic year 2013–14.

Dyson is the founder/owner of Dyson, Baidarka & Company, a designer of Aleut-style skin kayaks; he is credited with the revival of the baidarka style of kayak.

Dyson was a visiting lecturer and research associate at Western Washington University's Fairhaven College and was Director's Visitor at the Institute for Advanced Study in Princeton, New Jersey, in 2002–03. He is a frequent contributor to the Edge Foundation.

Media appearances
 To Mars by A-Bomb: The Secret History of Project Orion (BBC, 2003) 
 The Starship and the Canoe (1986)

Books
 Baidarka the Kayak
 Darwin Among the Machines
 Project Orion: The Atomic Spaceship 1957–1965
 Turing's Cathedral,
 Analogia: The Entangled Destinies of Nature, Human Beings and Machines

Personal life
George Dyson is the son of the theoretical physicist Freeman Dyson and mathematician Verena Huber-Dyson, the brother of technology analyst Esther Dyson, and the grandson of the British composer Sir George Dyson.

George Dyson and Ann Yow-Dyson have a daughter named Lauren. He lives and works in Bellingham, Washington.

References

External links

 George Dyson's Flickr Photostream
 Dyson, Baidarka & Company (Flickr Photostream by Thomas Gotchy)
 A lecture by George Dyson on "von Neumann's universe"
 Engineers' Dreams
 
 George Dyson: The story of Project Orion (TED2002)
 George Dyson: The birth of the computer (TED2003)
 http://zenbeat.t-galaxy.com/e2703892.html

1953 births
Living people
Historians of science
Freeman Dyson